The 1905 University of Utah football team was an American football team that represented the University of Utah as an independent during the 1905 college football season. In its second season under head coach Joe Maddock, the team compiled a 6–2 record, shut out five of eight opponents, and outscored all opponents by a total of 260 to 74. Tackle Henry "Pete" Peterson was the team captain.

On October 28, the team defeated the soldiers from Fort Douglas by a score of 129 to 0, an outcome that remains both the highest point total and largest margin of victory in school history.

Schedule

References

University of Utah
Utah Utes football seasons
University of Utah football